Peter Carlström (born 24 May 1956) is a Swedish water polo player. He competed in the men's tournament at the 1980 Summer Olympics.

References

1956 births
Living people
Swedish male water polo players
Olympic water polo players of Sweden
Water polo players at the 1980 Summer Olympics
Sportspeople from Västerås